The 2018 Trofeo Laigueglia was a one-day road cycling race that took place on 11 February 2018 in and around Laigueglia, Italy. It was the 55th edition of the Trofeo Laigueglia and was rated as a 1.HC event as part of the 2018 UCI Europe Tour.

The race was won by Moreno Moser, riding for an Italian national team select, accelerating 100 metres from the summit of the climb through the hilltop village of Colla Micheri to open a decisive gap. Second place went to Paolo Totò for the  team, ahead of 's Matteo Busato.

Teams
Twenty-two teams were invited to take part in the race. These included one UCI WorldTeam, thirteen UCI Professional Continental teams, seven UCI Continental teams and an Italian national team.

Result

References

External links

2018 UCI Europe Tour
2018 in Italian sport
2018